Liene Sastapa (born 14 January 1972) is a Latvian rower. She competed in the women's coxless pair event at the 1992 Summer Olympics.

References

1972 births
Living people
Latvian female rowers
Olympic rowers of Latvia
Rowers at the 1992 Summer Olympics
Sportspeople from Riga